Schneider's Anti-Noise Crusade is a 1909 American silent film comedy written and directed by D. W. Griffith, produced by the American Mutoscope and Biograph Company in New York City, and co-starring John R. Cumpson and Florence Lawrence. At its release in April 1909, the short was distributed to theaters on a "split reel", which was a single reel that accommodated more than one film. This short shared its reel with another Biograph comedy directed by Griffith, A Rude Hostess.

Original contact-print paper rolls of both motion pictures, as well as projectable safety-stock copies of them, are preserved in the Library of Congress.

Plot
The film depicts the mounting frustrations experienced by Mr. Schneider, who is living with his wife in an apartment. There he is trying desperately to concentrate on writing a special composition or "poetic effusion" for his "Liederkranz" (choir) while being repeatedly distracted and increasingly annoyed by activities and noises that surround him. He must cope with the rambunctious behavior of his young nephew Fritz playing a trombone, a squawking pet bird, a phonograph, and tolerate his wife and another musician practicing the violin. The following summary of the screenplay, which is from Kemp R. Niver's extensive 1985 reference Early Motion Pictures: The Paper Print Collection in the Library of Congress, provides additional details about the plot:

Cast

 John R. Cumpson as Mr. Schneider
 Florence Lawrence as Mrs. Schneider
 Anita Hendrie as Lena, Mr. Schneider's sister
 Arthur V. Johnson as violinist
 Jeanie MacPherson as maid
 Owen Moore as first thief
 Herbert Prior as second thief
 Tony O'Sullivan in unverified role
 Clara T. Bracy as extra
 Flora French as extra
 Mack Sennett as extra

Production

The screenplay for this short is credited to D. W. Griffith, who also directed the picture at Biograph's main studio, which in 1909 was located inside a large renovated brownstone mansion in New York City, in Manhattan, at 11 East 14th Street. The comedy was filmed there on interior sets in just two daysMarch 8 and 9, 1909by Biograph cinematographers G. W. "Billy" Bitzer and his assistant Arthur Marvin.

Biograph's uncredited actors
Identifying cast members in early Biograph releases such as Schneider's Anti-Noise Crusade is made more difficult by the fact that the studio, as a matter of company policy, did not begin publicly crediting its performers on screen, in trade publications, or in newspaper advertisements until four years after this short's release. John R. Cumpson and Florence Lawrence, although co-stars in this short, were uncredited in their roles on screen and in print, as were the rest of Biograph's relatively small staff of "photoplayers" in the studio's productions in 1909. At that time, Lawrence was already gaining widespread celebrity among filmgoers. Few people, though, outside the motion picture industry knew her name, so the actress was referred to by admirers and in news publications as simply "the Biograph girl".

Release and reception

After their release on April 8, 1909, Schneider's Anti-Noise Crusade and its split-reel companion  A Rude Hostess circulated to theaters throughout the United States for the next year. The two shorts were widely promoted in newspapers and in film-industry publications. One unnamed reviewer for the New York journal The Moving Picture World evidently found Schneider's Anti-Noise Crusade to be refreshing and wholesome entertainment, describing it to readers as "a clean bit of comedy" and "a welcome relief from some of the inane things that pass for comedy."

In the months after the film's release, most published comments about the Biograph production are not independent, non-biased assessments; instead, they are from advertisers or theater owners who simply had commercial interests in attracting audiences. Also, to widen the appeal of vaudeville shows at the time, many theatres routinely presented several films or "photoplays" to complement the traditional offerings of live stage performances. The Courier-Journal in Louisville, Kentucky in its April 26, 1909 issue informs local residents that to mark the "second week of vaudeville" at the city's Hopkins Theatre, audiences could enjoy acts by sleight-of-hand artist "Professor Leo", a clog dancer, storytellers, and singers. The newspaper then states that "the moving pictures" being offered on the program "cover a wide range of interesting subjects", adding that "The leading funmaking film is one called 'Schneider's Anti-noise  Crusade.'" At theatres elsewhere in 1909, the "especially interesting" comedy proved to be popular and continued to be featured and promoted as the lead film in variety shows.

Preservation status
Photographic prints and a film negative and positive of Schneider's Anti-Noise Crusade survive in the Library of Congress (LC)), which holds a 206-foot roll of paper images printed frame-by-frame directly from the comedy's original 35mm master negative. Submitted by Biograph to the United States government in 1909, shortly before the film's release, the roll is part of the original documentation required by federal authorities for motion-picture companies to obtain copyright protection for their productions. While the LC's paper roll of the film is certainly not projectable, a negative copy of the roll's paper images was made and transferred onto modern polyester-based safety film stock to produce a positive print for screening. Those copies were made as part of a preservation project carried out during the 1950s and early 1960s by Kemp R. Niver and other LC staff, who restored more than 3,000 early paper rolls of film images from the library's collection and created safety-stock copies.

See also
 D. W. Griffith filmography

Notes

References

External links

 

1909 films
1909 comedy films
1909 short films
Silent American comedy films
American silent short films
American black-and-white films
Biograph Company films
Films directed by D. W. Griffith
Films shot in New York City
Films shot in New York (state)
American comedy short films
1900s American films